In the wake of the 1947–48 Civil War in Mandatory Palestine, a riot against the Jewish community of Manama, in the British Protectorate of Bahrain, on December 5, 1947. A mob of Iranian and Trucial States sailors ran through the Manama Souq, looted Jewish homes and shops, and destroyed the synagogue. One Jewish woman died; she was either killed or died from fright.

Background

Bahrain's tiny Jewish community, mostly the Jewish descendants of immigrants who entered the country in the early 1900s from Iraq, numbered 600 in 1948.

The riots
In the wake of the November 29, 1947 U.N. Partition vote, demonstrations against the vote in the Arab world were called for December 2–5. The first two days of demonstrations in Bahrain saw rock throwing against Jews, but on December 5, mobs in the capital of Manama looted Jewish homes and shops in the city's Jewish district (Al-Mutanabi Road). The riots led to the sacking of the only synagogue in Bahrain, and had resulted in the death of an elderly woman and scores of Jews were injured. Local Jews blamed the riots on foreign Arabs.

Jewish exodus from Bahrain

After the riots, Bahraini Jews left en masse, some emigrating to Israel, others to England or America. They were allowed to leave with their property, although they were forced to give up their citizenship. An estimated 500 to 600 Jews remained in Bahrain until riots broke out after the Six-Day War in 1967; as of 2006 only 36 remained.

Objecting views on Bahraini state responsibility
Houda Nonoo told the London Independent newspaper in 2007: "I don't think it was Bahrainis who were responsible. It was people from abroad. Many Bahrainis looked after Jews in their houses." This view is supported by Sir Charles Belgrave, formerly a political adviser to the government of Bahrain – which at the time was subject to treaty relations with Britain – who recalled in a memoir: "The leading Arabs were very shocked ... most of them, when possible, had given shelter and protection to their Jewish neighbours... [the riots] had one surprising effect; it put an end to any active aggression by the Bahrain Arabs against the Bahrain Jews."

See also	
Farhud	
1945 Tripoli pogrom	
1945 Cairo pogrom

References 

Anti-Jewish pogroms by Muslims
Ethnic riots
Jews and Judaism in Bahrain
1947–1948 civil war in Mandatory Palestine
December 1947 events in Asia
1947 riots
1947 in Bahrain
Crime in Bahrain
1947 crimes in Bahrain
1947 in Judaism
Anti-Jewish pogroms by Muslims 1941-49
Massacres in 1947
1947 murders in Asia